Eremochroa is a genus of moths of the family Noctuidae.

Species
 Eremochroa alphitias Meyrick, 1897 (Australia)
 Eremochroa lunata (Lower, 1903)
 Eremochroa macropa (Lower, 1897)
 Eremochroa paradesma Lower, 1902 (Australia)
 Eremochroa psammias Meyrick, 1897 (Australia)
 Eremochroa thermidora Hampson, 1909

References
Natural History Museum Lepidoptera genus database
Eremochroa at funet

Hadeninae